Deportivo Universidad de Centroamericana , commonly known as UCA, is a Nicaraguan football team which used to play at the top level.  They represent the Central American University (Managua) (UCA).

History
Based in Managua, they have won four league titles, including three straight from 1975 to 1977.  However, they are no longer a top flight team and have not won a title since 1977.

Achievements
Primera División de Nicaragua: 4
1968, 1975 ,1976, 1977

References

Football clubs in Nicaragua
University and college association football clubs